Phoenix Citadel Mall is a shopping mall in the city of Indore, Madhya Pradesh, India.

The mall is spread over 3 floors and has a dedicated building for parking. It has 1,000,000 leasing area for shopping brands. It has a dedicated open area in front of the mall as well.

Facilities

Stores
 Kimirica, a luxury brand opened its flagship store recently at the mall.

Multiplex
 The mall features an INOX multiplex along with its premium offering Insignia.

Food Court 
 There is a dedicated Food Court area with ample seating space.

See also
 Treasure Island Next Mall
 C21 Mall, Indore

References

Shopping malls in Madhya Pradesh
Shopping malls established in 2022
2022 establishments in Madhya Pradesh